Fuad Isgandarov  (born August 6, 1961, in Baku), also spelled as Fuad Iskandarov is the Ambassador Extraordinary and Plenipotentiary of the Republic of Azerbaijan to the Kingdom of Belgium since 2012. At the same time, he is the head of the delegation of the Republic of Azerbaijan to the European Union.

Education
In 1978, Isgandarov successfully completed his secondary education and has been graduated from the secondary school no. 174 in Baku. At the same year he has been admitted to the Institute of International Relations and International Law of Kiev University. In 1983, he obtained the bachelor's degrees from both International Economic Relations and English Interpretation. In addition, Isgandarov participated in various training courses. In November 1999, he attained the Executive Training Program on Crisis Management of International Law-Enforcement Academy held in Budapest, Hungary. Furthermore, he was a participant of the Black Sea executive program of John F. Kennedy School of Government, Harvard University in 2001. One year later in 2002, he took part at the executive courses on legislation organized by the U.S. Department of State, U.S. Department of Justice. Finally, Fuad Isgandarov involved in the seminar on the Role of National Military Strategy organized by George C. Marshall European Center for Security Studies in 2006.

Teaching and scientific activity
In 1983–1986, Isgandarov worked as a post-graduate scientific researcher and assistant professor at the Chair of Political Economy, Azerbaijan State Economic University. Moreover, he was a part-time lecturer at the Chair of Theory of Translation, Azerbaijan University of Languages in 1984-1985 as well. After a long period, Isgandarov again worked as a part-time lecturer at the Chair of International Relations and International Law, Baku State University from 2000 to 2003.

Professional experience
From 1986 to 1995, Fuad Isgandarov was in the military service. In April 1995, he started his professional career as the head of the Department of Information and Analysis at the Ministry of National Security of Azerbaijan. He remained in his post until he was appointed the Deputy Minister of National Security for political affairs in 2002. In 2006, Isgandarov became an ambassador-at-large of the Ministry of Foreign Affairs of Azerbaijan. In 2006–2007, he was the Secretary-General of the National Commission for UNESCO of the Republic of Azerbaijan. Isgandarov was the Ambassador of Azerbaijan to the Kingdom of the Netherlands from 2007 to 2012. Currently, he is the Ambassador of Azerbaijan to the Kingdom of Belgium since September 25, 2012.

Personal life
Fuad Isgandarov is married and has a son and a daughter. Other than his native Azerbaijani, he speaks fluent Russian, English and Turkish.

References

Living people
Diplomats from Baku
Ambassadors of Azerbaijan to the Netherlands
Ambassadors of Azerbaijan to Belgium
Permanent Representatives of Azerbaijan to the Organisation for the Prohibition of Chemical Weapons
1961 births